Canada competed at the 2020 Summer Paralympics in Tokyo, Japan, from 24 August to 5 September 2021. 

On August 8, 2021, the Canadian Paralympic Committee announced the final team of 128 athletes (57 men and 71 women) competing in 128 sports. A total of 113 coaches and support staff will also accompany the team.

On August 21, 2021, judoka Priscilla Gagné was announced as Canada's flagbearer during the opening ceremony.

Medalists

Competitors
The following is the list of athletes per sport/discipline.

Archery 

Canada qualified one female archer. Karen Van Nest qualified by winning silver at the Pan American Championships in Monterrey, Mexico. This will make her sixth appearance at the Paralympic Games.

Athletics (track and field) 

Canada's track and field team of 16 athletes (nine men and seven women) was announced on July 30, 2021.

Men's track

Men's field

Women's track

Women's field

Badminton 

Canada qualified one female badminton athlete. Olivia Meier qualified to compete in the women's singles SL4 event. The appearance will also mark Canada's debut in the sport at the Paralympics.

Boccia 

Canada qualified in BC4 & Individual BC2 events, they include Danik Allard, Iulian Ciobanu, Marco Dispaltro and Alison Levine.

Individual

Pairs

Cycling 

Canada qualified a total of nine cyclists (five men and four women). Canada will compete in both disciplines (road and track), with four athletes Tristen Chernove, Ross Wilson, Kate O'Brien and Keely Shaw competing in both. The team was named on July 7, 2021. On August 30, 2021, Tristen Chernove withdrew from the Games after announcing his immediate retirement.

Road
Men

Women

Track
Pursuit

Time trial

Equestrian 

Canada qualified a team of four equestrians. The team was officially named on July 20, 2021.

Individual

Team

Goalball 

Summary

Women

The women's goalball team qualified by being one of two teams from the 2019 IBSA Goalball Paralympic Ranking Tournament to not have qualified through other tournaments.

Roster
Canada's roster of six athletes was named on June 24, 2021.

Brieann Baldock
Whitney Bogart
Amy Burk
Meghan Mahon
Emma Reinke
Maryam Salehizadeh

Group stage

Judo 

Canada qualified one female judoka. Priscilla Gagné was officially named to the team on July 16, 2021.

Paracanoeing 

Canada qualified four boats and three athletes (one man and two women). The team was announced on August 6, 2021. All three canoeists are making their Paralympic debut.

Paratriathlon 

Canada qualified four triathletes (one man and three women). The team was officially named on July 12, 2021.

Rowing

Canada qualified two boats in mixed events for the games. The mixed coxed four crews qualified by winning the gold medal at the 2021 Final Qualification Regatta in Varese, Italy. While the mixed Double sculls received a bipartite commission invitation allocation. The team of seven rowers was announced on August 4, 2021.

Qualification Legend: FA=Final A (medal); FB=Final B (non-medal); R=Repechage

Shooting 

Canada qualified two shooters (one per gender) through bipartie slot allocations. The team was named on August 6, 2021.

Sitting volleyball 

Summary

Women's tournament

The Canada women's national sitting volleyball team qualified for the 2020 Summer Paralympics after winning the 2020 World ParaVolley Final Paralympic Qualification Event held in Halifax, Nova Scotia, Canada.

Roster
Canada's 11 member squad was named on July 22, 2021.

Angelena Dolezar
Danielle Ellis
Anne Fergusson
Julie Kozun
Jennifer Oakes
Heidi Peters
Amber Skyrpan
Payden Vair
Felicia Voss-Shafiq
Jolan Wong
Katelyn Wright

Group play

Swimming 

Canada qualified nineteen swimmers: six male swimmers including Nicolas-Guy Turbide who won a bronze medal at the 2016 Summer Paralympics and thirteen female swimmers including Aurelie Rivard and Katarina Roxon who both won medals at the last Paralympic Games. Tess Routliffe was scheduled to compete but withdrew from the swimming team following an injury that occurred at the World Para Swimming World Series finale in Berlin, Routliffe's teammate Danielle Kisser replaced her.
Men

Women

Wheelchair basketball 

Summary

Men's tournament

The men's team qualified by winning the silver medal at the 2019 Parapan American Games in Lima, Peru.

Roster
Canada's 12 team member squad was announced on July 19, 2021.

Patrick Anderson
Vincent Dallaire
Nik Goncin
Deion Green 
Bo Hedges 
Colin Higgins 
Chad Jassman 
Lee Melymick 
Tyler Miller 
Blaise Mutware
Garrett Ostepchuk
Jonathan Vermette

Women's tournament

The women's team qualified by winning the gold medal at the 2019 Parapan American Games in Lima, Peru.

Roster
Canada's 11 team member squad was announced on July 19, 2021.

Sandrine Bérubé
Kady Dandeneau
Danielle DuPlessis
Melanie Hawtin 
Puisand Lai 
Rosalie Lalonde 
Tara Llanes 
Cindy Ouellet 
Tamara Steeves 
Élodie Tessier
Arinn Young

Wheelchair fencing 

Canada qualified four athletes (three men and one women). The team was officially named on July 9, 2021.

Wheelchair rugby

The Canadian team qualified for the games by winning the Final Qualification Tournament held in Richmond, British Columbia in March 2020.

Summary

Team roster
Canada's 12 team roster was announced on July 28, 2021.

Cody Caldwell
Patrice Dagenais
Eric Furtado-Rodrigues 
Byron Green
Trevor Hirschfield
Fabien Lavoie
Anthony Létourneau
Zak Madell
Travis Murao
Patrice Simard
Shayne Smith
Mike Whitehead

Group stage

Wheelchair tennis

Canada qualified one wheelchair tennis athlete. Robert Shaw qualified by being ranked 9th in the world.

See also
Canada at the 2018 Commonwealth Games
Canada at the 2019 Parapan American Games
Canada at the 2020 Summer Olympics

References

Nations at the 2020 Summer Paralympics
2020
2021 in Canadian sports